Benguela is a province of Angola, situated in the west of the country. It lies on the Atlantic Ocean, and borders the provinces of Cuanza Sul, Namibe, Huila, and Huambo. According to the 2014 census, there were 2,231,385 inhabitants in the province. The current governor of Benguela is Isaac dos Anjos.

History
In the 16th-century there existed a Kingdom of Benguela. Its ruler first contacted agents of the Portuguese government in 1586 after Dias de Novais had defeated the forces of the ruler of Ndongo. A Portuguese attempt to contact the rulers of Benguela failed in 1587.

As of 1600 the ruler of Benguela was Hombi a Njimbe (sometimes Anglicized as Hombiangymbe). The kingdom at that time stretched from the headwaters of the Cuvo River to the Longa River, covering the northwestern highlands of what is today Angola. This area at the time was primarily Umbundu speaking.

The Portuguese crown created the Kingdom of Benguela in 1615 to improve the conditions to develop the desired land route to Mozambique across Africa. The trading post founded here did not meet the expectations of the Portuguese in mineral resources and soil quality, so a village was only established for the slave trade, under the name of Mbaka.

With the era of imperialist efforts of European countries to acquire colonies in Africa, at the end of the 19th century, Portugal increased its presence in the region in order to protect them from the advances of the German Empire and other states. Even before the Berlin Congo Conference in 1884–85, when European powers divided up the African colonial territories among themselves, Portugal had strengthened its colonial administration as early as 1869, and divided the three districts of Luanda, Benguela and Moçâmedes (now Namibe). From 1903, the Benguela Railway was built connecting the port of Lobito to Belgian Congo, which led to the growing importance of the port and industries emerged, particularly the processing of sisal fiber, which contributed to the development of district of Benguela. By 1912, the Benguela Railway had reached Huambo from Lobito, and the line was eventually completed in 1929. Mostly after 1938, Benguela city's rubber and ivory trade made it a "relevant commercial warehouse".

Since the 1960s, with increased competition in the sisal trade worldwide, rich fish stocks off the coast have been one of the principal economic drivers of the region. From the late 1960s the population structure has changed, partly due to the regional economic upheaval, the massive emigration of European settlers from Angola when it became independent in 1975, and the influx of many IDPs during the Angolan Civil War (1975–2002); 1988 figures put the displaced population in the province at 21,478, living in nine camps.

Geography
Benguela Province is situated in the west of the country, on the Atlantic coast. It also borders the provinces of Cuanza Sul (to the north), Namibe (to the southwest), Huila (to the southeast), and Huambo (to the east).

Municipalities

The province of Benguela contains ten municipalities:

 Baía-Farta
 Balombo
 Benguela
 Bocoio
 Caimbambo
 Catumbela
 Chongorói
 Cubal
 Ganda
 Lobito

Communes
The province of Benguela contains the following communes; sorted by their respective municipalities:

 Baia-Farta Municipality: – Baía-Farta, Calohanga (Kalohanga), Dombe Grande, Equimina
 Balombo Municipality: – Balombo, Chindumbo (Chidumbo), Chingongo (Chigongo), Maca Mombolo
 Benguela Municipality: – Benguela; which is subdivided into six zones
 Bocoio Municipality: – Bocoio, Cavimbe, Chila, Cubal do Lumbo, Monte Belo, Passe
 Caimbambo Municipality: – Caiave, Caimbambo, Canhamela, Catengue, Viangombe
 Catumbela Municipality: – Biópio, Catumbela, Gama, Praia Bebe
 Chongorói Municipality: – Bolongueira (Bolongueira), Camuine (Kamuine), Chongorói
 Cubal Municipality: – Capupa, Cubal, Iambala (Imbala), Tumbulo (Lomaum)
 Ganda Municipality: – Babaera, Casseque (Kasseque), Chicuma (Chikuma), Ebanga, Ganda
 Lobito Municipality: – Canjala, Egipto Praia (Egito), Lobito-Canata

Culture
The predominant ethnic groups are the Ovimbundu and Ngangela. The majority language is Umbundu.

List of governors of Benguela

References

External links
 
 Official website of province governor
 Information on this province at the Angolan ministry for territorial administration
 Province geographical info at geoview.info

 
Provinces of Angola